Logistics automation is the application of computer software or automated machinery to improve the efficiency of logistics operations.  Typically this refers to operations within a warehouse or distribution center, with broader tasks undertaken by supply chain engineering systems and enterprise resource planning systems.

Logistics automation systems can powerfully complement the facilities provided by these higher level computer systems. The focus on an individual node within a wider logistics network allows systems to be highly tailored to the requirements of that node.

Components

Logistics automation systems comprise a variety of hardware and software components:

 Fixed machinery
 Automated storage and retrieval systems, including:
 Cranes serve a rack of locations, allowing many levels of stock to be stacked vertically, and allowing for higher storage densities and better space utilization than alternatives.
 In systems produced by Amazon Robotics, automated guided vehicles move items to a human picker.
 Conveyors: Containers can enter automated conveyors in one area of the warehouse and, either through hard-coded rules or data input, be moved to a selected destination.
 Vertical carousels based on the paternoster lift system or using space optimization, similar to vending machines, but on a larger scale.
 Sortation systems: similar to conveyors but typically with higher capacity and able to divert containers more quickly.  Typically used to distribute high volumes of small cartons to a large set of locations.
 Industrial robots: four- to six-axis industrial robots, e.g. palleting robots, are used for palleting, depalleting, packaging, commissioning and order picking.
 Typically all of these will automatically identify and track containers using barcodes or, increasingly, RFID tags.
 Motion check weighers may be used to reject cases or individual products that are under or over their specified weight.  They are often used in kitting conveyor lines to ensure all pieces belonging in the kit are present.
Mobile technology
Radio data terminals: these are handheld or truck-mounted terminals which connect by radio to logistics automation software and provide instructions to operators moving throughout the warehouse.  Many also have barcode scanners to allow identification of containers more quickly and accurately than manual keyboard entry.
 Software
 Integration software: this provides overall control of the automation machinery and allows cranes to be connected to conveyors for seamless stock movements.
 Operational control software: provides low-level decision-making, such as where to store incoming containers, and where to retrieve them when requested.
 Business control software: provides higher-level functionality, such as identification of incoming deliveries/stock, scheduling order fulfillment, and assignment of stock to outgoing trailers.

Benefits of logistics automation
A typical warehouse or distribution center will receive stock of a variety of products from suppliers and store these until the receipt of orders from customers, whether individual buyers (e.g. mail order), retail branches (e.g. chain stores), or other companies (e.g. wholesalers).  A logistics automation system may provide the following:

 Automated goods in processes: Incoming goods can be marked with barcodes and the automation system notified of the expected stock.  On arrival, the goods can be scanned and thereby identified, and taken via conveyors, sortation systems, and automated cranes into an automatically assigned storage location.
 Automated Goods Retrieval for Orders: On receipt of orders, the automation system is able to immediately locate goods and retrieve them to a pick-face location.
 Automated dispatch processing: Combining knowledge of all orders placed at the warehouse the automation system can assign picked goods into dispatch units and then into outbound loads.  Sortation systems and conveyors can then move these onto the outgoing trailers.
 If needed, repackaging to ensure proper protection for further distribution or to change the package format for specific retailers/customers.

A complete warehouse automation system can drastically reduce the workforce required to run a facility, with human input required only for a few tasks, such as picking units of product from a bulk packed case.  Even here, assistance can be provided with equipment such as pick-to-light units.  Smaller systems may only be required to handle part of the process.  Examples include automated storage and retrieval systems, which simply use cranes to store and retrieve identified cases or pallets, typically into a high-bay storage system which would be unfeasible to access using fork-lift trucks or any other means. The use of Automatic Guided Vehicles maximizes the output compared to humans since they can do repetitive tasks for long hours and with least to no supervision. An AGV is built and programmed for precision and accuracy thereby reducing the chances of errors in a warehouse, especially when dealing with fragile goods.

Automation software
Software or cloud-based SaaS solutions are used for logistics automation which helps the supply chain industry in automating the workflow as well as management of the system. There are  few generalized software available in the new market in the said topology. This is because there is no rule to generalize the system as well as work flow even though the practice is more or less the same. Most of the commercial companies do use one or the other of the custom solutions.

But there are various software solutions that are being used within the departments of logistics. There are a few departments in Logistics, namely: Conventional Department, Container Department, Warehouse, Marine Engineering, Heavy Haulage, etc.

Software used in these departments

 Conventional department : CVT software / CTMS software.
 Container Trucking: CTMS software
 Warehouse : WMS/WCS

Improving Effectiveness of Logistics Management

 Logistical Network
 Information
 Transportation
 Sound Inventory Management
 Warehousing, Materials Handling & Packaging

See also

Automation
Autonomous logistics
Material handling equipment
Self-driving truck
Automated storage and retrieval system
Automated guided vehicle

References

 Yam, K. L., "Encyclopedia of Packaging Technology", John Wiley & Sons, 2009, 

Freight transport
Automation
Packaging machinery